John Schmidt Nielsen (born 7 April 1972) is a Danish former association football player, who played for Ikast and Viborg FF of the Danish Superliga. He moved abroad to play professionally for Southend United and Leiftur.

Club career
In summer 1996 Nielsen was signed for Southend United by player-manager Ronnie Whelan. After being allowed to join Leiftur on loan, Nielsen was handed a free transfer by Southend's subsequent manager Alvin Martin.

References

External links
Profile at Bild.de 

1972 births
Living people
Danish men's footballers
Danish expatriate men's footballers
Southend United F.C. players
English Football League players
Expatriate footballers in England
Expatriate footballers in Iceland
Danish expatriate sportspeople in England
Danish Superliga players
Ikast FS players
Viborg FF players
Association football midfielders
Footballers from Aarhus